Carlo Rizzi may refer to:

Carlo Rizzi (conductor) (born 1960), Italian conductor
Carlo Rizzi (The Godfather), a fictional character in the novel The Godfather